Tootell is a surname. Notable people with the surname include:

Edward Tootell (1849–1878), English cricketer
Fred Tootell (1902–1964), American hammer thrower
Hugh Tootell (1671/72 – 1743), English Roman Catholic historian

See also
Tootell House, a house in Kingston, Rhode Island, United States